In organization theory, mutual aid is a voluntary reciprocal exchange of resources and services for mutual benefit. Mutual aid projects can be a form of political participation in which people take responsibility for caring for one another and changing political conditions.

Mutual aid has been used to provide people with food, medical care, and supplies, as well as provide relief from disasters, such as natural disasters and pandemics.

Origins 

The term "mutual aid" was popularised by the anarchist philosopher Peter Kropotkin in his essay collection Mutual Aid: A Factor of Evolution, which argued that cooperation, not competition, was the driving mechanism behind evolution, through biological mutualism. Kropotkin argued that mutual aid has pragmatic advantages for the survival of humans and animals and has been promoted through natural selection, and that mutual aid is arguably as ancient as human culture. This recognition of the widespread character and individual benefit of mutual aid stood in contrast to the theories of social Darwinism that emphasized individual competition and survival of the fittest, and against the ideas of liberals such as Jean-Jacques Rousseau, who thought that cooperation was motivated by universal love.

Practice 

Mutual aid participants work together to figure out strategies and resources to meet each other's needs, such as food, housing, medical care, and disaster relief, while organizing themselves against the system that created the shortage in the first place.

Typically, mutual-aid groups are member-led, member-organized, and open to all to participate in. They often have non-hierarchical, non-bureaucratic structures, with members controlling all resources. They are egalitarian in nature and designed to support participatory democracy, equality of member status, power-shared leadership, and consensus-based decision-making.

Mutual aid vs. charity 

As defined by radical activist and writer Dean Spade and explored in his University of Chicago course "Queer and Trans Mutual Aid for Survival and Mobilization", mutual aid is distinct from charity. Radical activist, social welfare scholar, and social worker Benjamin Shepard defines mutual aid as "people giv[ing] what they can and get[ting] what they need." Mutual aid projects are often critical of the charity model, and may use the motto "solidarity, not charity" to differentiate themselves from charities.

Challenges to mutual aid 

 Lack of technical experts, funding, and legitimization by the public
 Lack of full-time staff may limit the volume of work that can be completed, especially work that must be done during traditional operating hours
 Informal status may disqualify eligibility for government grants and tax benefits
 Development of concentrated social hierarchies may lead to discrimination and a movement away from mutual aid principles
Burnout by those that are able to help maintain mutual aid projects

Examples 

In the 1800s and early 1900s, mutual aid organizations included unions, the Friendly Societies that were common throughout Europe in the eighteenth and nineteenth centuries, medieval craft guilds, the American "fraternity societies" that existed during the Great Depression providing their members with health and life insurance and funeral benefits, and the English working men's clubs of the 1930s that also provided health insurance. In the United States, mutual aid has been practiced extensively in marginalized communities, notably in Black communities, working-class neighborhoods, migrant groups, LGBT communities, and others.

Food, medical care, and supplies 

In 1969, the Black Panthers created the Free Breakfast for Children programme to serve families in Oakland, California. By the end of 1969, the program fed 20,000 children across 19 cities. Other survival programs included clothing distribution, classes on politics and economics, free medical clinics, lessons on self-defense and first aid, transportation to upstate prisons for family members of inmates, an emergency-response ambulance program, drug and alcohol rehabilitation, and testing for sickle-cell disease.

In the 1970s, the Young Lords, an organization devoted to neighborhood empowerment and self-determination of Puerto Ricans, Latinos, and colonized people in the United States, operated multiple community programs, including free breakfast for children, the Emeterio Betances free health clinic, free dental clinic, community testing for tuberculosis and lead-poisoning, community day care center, free clothing drives, and "Garbage Offensive" to clean up garbage in Puerto Rican neighborhoods neglected by city sanitation.

Food Not Bombs was founded in the United States in 1980 by anti-nuclear activists to share free vegetarian food with hungry people and protest war, poverty, and destruction of the environment. Today, Food Not Bombs continues to recover food that would otherwise be discarded and shares free food in over 1,000 cities in 65 countries.

Disaster relief

Occupy Sandy 

In 2012 in the aftermath of Hurricane Sandy in the NYC area, mutual aid efforts called Occupy Sandy helped facilitate aid faster and with more efficacy than  federal government efforts at the time.

Hurricane Katrina 

In 2005 after Hurricane Katrina, mutual aid efforts in New Orleans began through the Common Ground Collective. Efforts included aid distribution centers, opening seven medical clinics, house-gutting, roof-tarping, building neighborhood computer centers, debris removal, a tree planting service, establishing 90+ community gardens, and legal counselling services. In 2012 after Hurricane Sandy, people formerly associated with Occupy Wall Street formed Occupy Sandy to provide mutual aid to those affected by the storm. Occupy Sandy distributed clothes, blankets and food through various neighborhood hubs.

Mutual Aid Disaster Relief, a network of activists, has responded to flooding in Baton Rouge, flooding in West Virginia, Hurricane Matthew, Hurricane Harvey, Hurricane Irma, and Hurricane Maria by building health clinics, distributing medication and medical supplies, cleaning debris, gutting buildings, building infrastructure, and distributing supplies. Their aim is to support peoples' survival, empowerment, and self-determination.

2017 Puebla earthquake 

Due to mistrust of the federal government of Mexico and its corruption, a number of organizations and volunteers were prepared to meet the needs of the people of Mexico City immediately after the Tuesday, 19 September 2017 earthquake. This included removing debris from collapsed buildings, searching for survivors, providing medical attention, disseminating news and information, donating and distributing food, etc.

COVID-19 pandemic 

During the COVID-19 pandemic, local mutual aid groups and tools were established to help share resources and run errands.

In the Philippines 

Practical bottom–up efforts rooted in the traditional and precolonial spirit of bayanihan have been threatened with glib accusations of sympathizing with causes condemned by the National Task Force to End Local Communist Armed Conflict (NTF–ELCAC). Community pantries, set up in the wake of the COVID-19 pandemic, had been denounced by state officials as being fronts for the Communist Party of the Philippines. Lt. Gen. Antonio Parladé disapproved of the widely circulating narrative that the state had been inadequate in responding to the effects of its own measures in containing COVID-19. Communications Usec. Lorraine Badoy also slammed the National Democratic Front of the Philippines for allegedly setting up community pantries for seditious purposes.

The national-democratic human-rights network Karapatan, in an official statement, hit back, stressing, "Having already been the cause of hardship in the first place, they now have the gall to intimidate?" Senator Pánfilo Lacson also praised the mutual-aid efforts of pantry organizers.

In the United Kingdom 
The first COVID-19 mutual aid groups in the United Kingdom were founded in Lewisham, Battersea and Hackney on Thursday, 12 March 2020. The pandemic came shortly after the 2019 general election, and relationships formed by young activists as well as a growing political awareness during the Labour Party leadership of Jeremy Corbyn were important to the building of these groups.

The UK mutual aid groups have a wide variety of politics. The first groups took inspiration from anarchistic models of community organisation. For example, the Battersea group had a core team of local activists helping residents to self-organise in a non-hierarchical manner. This also allowed the group to connect with local, grassroots organisations providing social care and mental health services. Other groups were more charity-orientated with politics around saviorism rather than a horizontalist interpretation of mutual aid. Although the proliferation of mutual aid groups in the UK brought the term into the common parlance, not everyone involved in the groups are necessarily working from the same understanding of the origins and practice of mutual aid; for example some groups are more deferential to local authorities and politicians than others. Other conflicts in the early days of the groups included disputes over approaches to safeguarding and data protection (synonymous in the UK with the EU General Data Protection Regulation (GDPR)), for example over whether volunteers should be required to have a background check for simply checking in on their neighbours.

After the first few groups were set up, a website called "Covid-19 Mutual Aid" was created to help develop an organisational model for the mutual aid groups and facilitate the sharing of resources. It was frequently misreported as coordinating the groups.

COVID-19 mutual aid groups in the UK undertake a broadly similar range of activities: offering support around shopping, collecting prescriptions, dog walking, and offering a chat to those who are lonely due to self-isolation. Groups tend to organise themselves by initially setting up a Facebook group corresponding to a local authority area, and then from there linking to a WhatsApp group corresponding to a council ward. From there the way that groups organise themselves vary greatly but they usually involve producing leaflets with the phone number of one or several volunteers and then trying to reach as many people in the neighbourhood as possible. Other tools commonly used for organising include Slack, Google Docs, and Zoom.

In the context of the rapid growth of mutual aid groups across the UK, the government attempted to create a centralised effort with the NHS Volunteer Responders scheme. Almost 750,000 people signed up to it, although most of these people were not called upon due to organisational issues.

Academics from the Bennett Institute for Public Policy at the University of Cambridge found that the density of COVID-19 mutual aid groups in the United Kingdom was positively correlated with social capital (that is, areas which are already wealthy are more likely to benefit from the presence of mutual aid groups). In deprived areas like Wolverhampton, mutual aid groups were hampered by the legacy of the United Kingdom government austerity programme.

A report by the New Local Government Network concluded that mutual aid groups are an 'indispensable' part of the United Kingdom's coronavirus response.

Technology 
Academic and author Joseph M. Reagle Jr. has described contributing to Wikipedia as a form of mutual aid.

Redistribution of wealth and community care 

A Black-run Facebook group called "UK Mutual Aid" was set up in late 2018 to facilitate the voluntary sharing of wealth within marginalised communities.

See also 

 Benefit society
 Community fridge
 Gift economy
 Little Free Pantries
 Mutual Aid: A Factor of Evolution, by Peter Kropotkin
 Mutual credit
 Mutual organization
 Mutualism
 Solidarity
 Solidarity economy
 Sociability

References

Bibliography

Further reading 
 Mutual Aid: A Factor of Evolution, Peter Kropotkin, 1902
Hossein, Caroline Shenaz. 2018. The Black Social Economy. NY:Palgrave Macmillan
Syllabus, "Queer and Trans Mutual Aid for Survival and Mobilization" course at University of Chicago with professor Dean Spade
 What Is Mutual Aid, and How Can It Help With Coronavirus?
 For All The People: Uncovering the Hidden History of Cooperation, Cooperative Movements, and Communalism in America, PM Press, by John Curl, 2009
 "Help! Gegenseitig behindern oder helfen. Eine politische Skizze zur Wahrnehmung heute", Würzburg: Königshausen & Neumann, 2012

External links 
 Mutual Aid Societies (lecture by Sheldon Richman)
 Mutual aid and physical distancing is not new to the Black and racialized minorities in the Americas By Caroline S. Hossein.

Organizational theory
Mutualism (movement)
Social anarchism
Communism
Socialism
Syndicalism
Collectivism
Left-wing politics